Harrison Bay State Park is a  state demonstration park developed by the Tennessee Valley Authority in the 1930s along the shores of Chickamauga Lake. Opened in 1937, the bay gets it name from the now partially submerged town of Harrison, Tennessee. It was built at the same time as Booker T. Washington State Park.

The park has a 4.2-mile (6.8-km) hiking path around the lake and has facilities including a swimming pool, a playground, a golf course, tennis courts, a restaurant, a campground, and a marina.

References

External links 
 Official website

State parks of Tennessee
Protected areas of Hamilton County, Tennessee